Powell Manufacturing Company (PMC) was a company based in southern California, widely known for its line of motor scooters that peaked in popularity in the late 1940s. From September 1954 to March 1957, Powell manufactured "Sport Wagon" pickup trucks and station wagons.

In the 1960s and 1970s, they manufactured the "Powell Challenger" trail bikes.

The company originally began operations in 1926, and manufactured radios, then moving on to build approximately 1,200 pickup trucks, 300 station wagons, and three motor homes, and tens of thousands of scooters and trail bikes. The manufacturing address was listed as 2914 North Alameda Street in Compton, California, which was two miles south of the General Motors South Gate Assembly factory, and they had a showroom listed at 12700 S. Western Avenue.

History

The Powell Brothers, Hayward and Channing Powell, started manufacturing radios in the mid 1920s, immediately after they graduated from Manual Arts High School in Los Angeles in 1924. Their first company, Winner Radio, produced expensive radios which did not sell well and then inexpensive radios which did. 

During 1925, Hayward Powell developed appendicitis, and in early 1926 had an appendectomy. During Hayward's recovery, the brothers took a five-month cross-country trip. When they returned to Los Angeles, they started Powell Manufacturing Company in 1926 to make battery eliminators, soon also making box-style table radios typical of the 1920s. 

By 1930 they were part of the reputation of Los Angeles as the "midget capital of the world", making what are now referred to as cathedral-style table radios (midget in comparison to earlier floor-standing consoles and large-box table radios). In 1931 they were also selling the even-smaller "pee-wee" cathedral-style table radios which had become popular. Before they exited the radio business in 1932, they produced an innovative radio that was just nine inches square and thirty-four inches high, which was perhaps the forerunner of the chair-side style radios.

In the mid 1930s, they moved into scooter production. The Powell manufacturing facility in Compton, California, switched to war production in 1942.  After World War II, Powell again returned to scooter production with the C-47, P-48, P-49 step through models. The Powell Streamliner model, used by U.S. Airborne troops during World War II, was copied and served as the basis for the original Fuji Rabbit scooter in June 1946 (six months before the first Vespa scooter).

In 1949, the Powell company moved into the lightweight motorcycle market with the introduction of the P-81 model, which was a direct competitor of the Mustang (motorcycle) produced in nearby Glendale.  All four of these post-war Powell models used the same single-cylinder four-stroke 24-cubic-inch (393 cc) engine which was developed in-house.  Powell again switched to war production for the Korean War in the early 1950s and never returned to scooter production.

PMC was also an early innovator in pickup and SUV design with several models produced in the 1950s using modified 1941 Plymouth chassis recycled from junkyards. The pickup was sold as the Sport Wagon and the SUV as the Station Wagon. Powell's designs were later echoed in the Ford Ranchero and Chevrolet El Camino models which appeared a few years later. Motor Life magazine, in its October 1955 issue (with a photo of the Powell Sport Wagon on the cover), called it "an obvious choice as one of the most interesting and unique automobiles in the U.S." In the February 1956 issue of Motor Trend, magazine co-founder Walt Woron concluded his article: "The Powell Brothers, then, have succeeded in their purpose: to provide a vehicle that '... can't be beat for general utility...[that makes] the perfect runabout or 2nd family car...'".

In the 1960s, the company reorganized as Powell Brothers, Inc., and manufactured the "Powell Challenger" trail bikes. During this period, the company relocated to a larger facility at 5903 E. Firestone Boulevard in South Gate, California. Hayward Powell died in March 1978, and with Channing Powell retired, the company officially dissolved and closed its doors in April 1979. Channing Powell died in 1988.

References

External links
 US Scootermuseum
 
Defunct motor vehicle manufacturers of the United States
Scooter manufacturers
Minibikes
Compton, California
Consumer electronics brands
Amateur radio companies
Buildings and structures in Los Angeles County, California
1926 establishments in California
1979 disestablishments in California
Vehicle manufacturing companies established in 1926
Vehicle manufacturing companies disestablished in 1979
Defunct manufacturing companies based in Greater Los Angeles
Motor vehicle manufacturers based in California